Shangli Town is a town in Yucheng District, Ya'an, Sichuan, China. The town contains Shangli Ancient Town, a historic town that now acts as a tourist attraction.

References

Towns in Sichuan